Michael "Mickey" McDonagh (born 18 August 1998) is a British amateur boxer who is affiliated with Merlin's Bridge ABC. He won lightweight bronze in the 2018 Commonwealth Games.

McDonagh was selected to compete at the 2019 World Championships in Yekaterinburg, Russia, where he lost by split decision (4:0) to Thomas Blumenfeld in the first round.

References

1998 births
Living people
British male boxers
Commonwealth Games medallists in boxing
Commonwealth Games bronze medallists for Wales
Boxers at the 2018 Commonwealth Games
Lightweight boxers
Medallists at the 2018 Commonwealth Games